The Collégiale Saint-Thiébaut (Saint-Theobald collegiate church) in Thann, Haut-Rhin is one of the most ornate Gothic churches in the whole Upper Rhenish region (Alsace, Baden, North-Western Switzerland, Palatinate). Of its 76 meters high spire, it is said that "The spire of Strasbourg is the highest, the spire of Freiburg is the broadest but the spire of Thann is the prettiest." In spite of its name, the church is actually dedicated to Saint-Ubald, of which it keeps a finger as a relic. It is listed as a Monument historique since 1841 by the French Ministry of Culture.

The building 
The building was erected between 1332 (South lateral nave) and 1516 (achievement of the tower by master Rémy (or Remigius) Faesch from Basel). It was damaged during World War II.

The main tympanum, depicting 21 scenes of the life of Saint-Mary is framed by a quintuple row of sculpted archivolts, each representing several dozens of other biblical scenes, while the smaller tympana below (the northern one depicting the Crucifixion of Jesus and the southern one depicting the Birth of Christ and the Adoration of the Magi) are framed by a double row of archivolts, also depicting biblical scenes. The portal is further decorated on all sides by larger than life statues of saints displaying their attributes or acting out scenes. The whole represents one of the most ornate and elaborate examples of a "Poor Man's Bible" to be seen.

The north side of the church also presents a remarkable, if somewhat smaller portal (1415), less ornate as for its sculptures but architecturally more elaborate. The outside walls of the church are decorated all around by a total of 87 statues of saints.

Another striking feature of the church is the multicolored tile roof, not unlikely to the neighbouring St. Martin church's in Colmar.

The inside of the church is as richly ornate as the outside. The choir is the most decorated part: stained glass windows (15th century), stalls (1442, expanded 1902–1906), 12 statues of Apostles (15th century), Baroque paintings (1719 and 1733). Other parts of the church display statues (Virgin with child, 1510; Saint Ubald, 16th century; Jesus bearing the cross, 17th century), remains of frescoes (15th and 16th century), a baptismal font from the 16th century, a pulpit of 1629 and several Gothic revival statues and altars.

The church's organ's pipes and mechanism had to be replaced in 2001, but Saint-Thiébaut still keeps its magnificent Gothic revival organ case of 1888.

Inside dimensions 
Height of the choir windows:

Gallery

References

Literature 
René Kirner: La Collégiale Saint-Thiébaut de Thann, Imprimerie Lescuyer Lyon, 1st trimester 1990

External links 

Buildings and structures completed in 1516
Churches in Haut-Rhin
Monuments historiques of Haut-Rhin
Gothic architecture in France
1516 establishments in the Holy Roman Empire
16th-century Roman Catholic church buildings in France